Count Ivan Illarionovich Vorontsov  (1719-1786) was a senator, acting chamberlain, president of the Collegium of Estates in Moscow.

Biography
Ivan Illarionovich Vorontsov was an uncle of Princess Yekaterina Vorontsova-Dashkova and a younger brother of General-in-chief Roman Vorontsov and Chancellor Mikhail Illarionovich Vorontsov. 
  
His elder brother Mikhail Illarionovich Vorontsov participated in the palace coup in favor of the Empress Elizabeth in November 1741. The coup contributed to the rise of the Vorontsov brothers.

Ivan Illarionovich Vorontsov was promoted to captain of the Preobrazhensky Regiment in 1753. Two years later, he became a gentleman of the Chamber of Peter III.
Then Vorontsov was elevated, at the request of the Empress Elizabeth, to the title of Count in 1760. 

With the accession to the throne of Peter III of Russia, he was promoted to the rank of Lieutenant General.
  
Vorontsov married Maria Artemevna Volinskaya (daughter of A. Volinsky) in 1745. They had five children:

 Artemiy Ivanovich Vorontsov (1748-1813), 
 Anna Ivanovna Vorontsova (1750-1807), 
 Evdokia (Avdotya) Ivanovna Vorontsova (1755-1824),
 Illarion Ivanovich Vorontsov (1760-1790),
 Ulyana Ivanovna Vorontsova (1767-died in childhood).

Awards of Ivan Illarionovich Vorontsov -
 Order of Saint Anna First Class
 Order of the White Eagle

Sources
 Ivan Illarionovich Vorontsov - Biography
 I.I.Vorontsov - Bio

External links
 I.I.Vorontsov - rusmuseumvrm.ru 
M.A.Vorontsova - rusmumseuvrm.ru
 http://www.rulex.ru/rpg/portraits/28/28414.htm
 http://www.rulex.ru/rpg/portraits/28/28415.htm
 https://arthive.com/artists/1965~Georg_Gaspar_Joseph_von_Prener
 http://www.artsait.ru/art/p/prenner/art1.php
 https://museumsworld.ru/rossik/0prenner.html

1719 births
1786 deaths
Recipients of the Order of St. Anna
Senators of the Russian Empire
Counts of the Russian Empire
Ivan Illarionovich